Paul Reclus may refer to:

Paul Reclus (anarchist) (1858–1941), French anarchist.
Paul Reclus (surgeon) (1847–1914), French physician specializing in surgery.